SSAS may refer to:
 Ship Security Alert System
 Small Self Administered Scheme, a type of occupational trust-based pension scheme in the UK
 Solid State Ammonia Synthesis
 SQL Server Analysis Services
 SSAS, a class of the Order of the Star of South Africa